David Carter Cochrane (born January 31, 1963) is an American former professional utility player for the Seattle Mariners and Chicago White Sox of Major League Baseball (MLB). Cochrane was listed as 6'2 with a weight of 180 pounds. He was a switch hitter and threw right-handed.

Cochrane attended Troy High School in Fullerton, California then went to California State University, Fullerton. He was drafted by the New York Mets in the 1981 Major League Baseball Draft. In 1992, Cochrane played every field position for the Mariners except for pitcher and center field, a position that was held down by Ken Griffey Jr.

Cochrane's son, Steve Cochrane, played collegiate baseball for Georgia Southern University.

External links

1963 births
Living people
American expatriate baseball players in Canada
Baseball players from Riverside, California
Birmingham Barons players
Buffalo Bisons (minor league) players
Calgary Cannons players
Chicago White Sox players
Hawaii Islanders players
Jackson Mets players
Little Falls Mets players
Lynchburg Mets players
Major League Baseball catchers
Major League Baseball infielders
Major League Baseball outfielders
Seattle Mariners players
Alaska Goldpanners of Fairbanks players